Karim Hussain (Ottawa, born July 16, 1975) is a Canadian filmmaker and cinematographer.  As a director he is best known for his 2000 film Subconscious Cruelty, and as co-writer of Nacho Cerdà's The Abandoned. In 2006, he adapted French-Canadian writer Marie-Claire Blais' work, La Belle Bête. For it, he won the Director's Award at the Boston Underground Film Festival. As a cinematographer his best known work is Brandon Cronenberg's Possessor, Jason Eisener's Hobo With A Shotgun, Brandon Cronenberg's Antiviral and many others. He is a full member of the Canadian Society Of Cinematographers.

Filmography

Director
Films

Short films

Cinematographer
Films

Short films

References

External links

Canadian male screenwriters
Living people
1974 births
Place of birth missing (living people)
Canadian cinematographers
21st-century Canadian screenwriters
21st-century Canadian male writers